Harold L. Stuart was a prominent American financier of the early 20th century, and founder of the investment firm Halsey, Stuart & Co.

Biography
Stuart was born in Providence, Rhode Island in 1881, and moved to Chicago as a boy.  He began working in Chicago at just 12 years old as a messenger boy for a printing firm.  Some of his other early jobs included being a stock boy at Marshall Field & Company.  As a teenager, he became a bond salesman for the predecessor company to the Harris Trust Bank.

In 1903, he opened a Chicago branch office for the recently founded New York investment firm, N. W. Halsey Company.  Stuart competed with New York bankers when he started handling small bond offerings for the utility magnate Samuel Insull in 1907.  When N. W. Halsey died around the year 1911, Stuart bought the Chicago office of that organization and established Halsey, Stuart & Co.  In 1922, due to his growing trust in Stuart, Insull entrusted Stuart with a $27 million bond offering at a time when the bond market did not look promising.  Stuart was able to move the issue at an extremely low interest rate and as a result, Stuart become one of Insull’s chief financial officers.  Later in his life, Stuart recalled that he and Insull did about $2.3 billion worth of business.  In 1953, Federal Judge Harold R. Medina wrote that Stuart “probably knew more about the investment banking business than any other living person” after Stuart appeared as a government expert witness in an anti-trust suit brought against 17 leading investment houses.  At the time of Stuart’s death in 1966, the New York Times called Halsey, Stuart “one of the largest investment banking firms.”

Legacy
Harold L. Stuart was a national leader in the field of investment banking. Stuart was president of the brokerage house of Halsey, Stuart & Company. His decision to move the firm’s headquarters to Chicago played an important role in establishing the city as a leading financial center. In 1969, his bequest to IIT established the Harold Leonard Stuart School of Management and Finance, now the IIT Stuart School of Business.

In 1969, Illinois Institute of Technology (IIT) received a $5 million bequest from the Stuart estate which enabled the university to begin construction on the Stuart School of Business. The Stuart family has been key to the growth and progress of both the educational and research programs at IIT Stuart School of Business.

Ranked fifth in the United States and 42nd globally by Financial Times (2018) for our Master of Science in Finance program.

Ranked 15th in the U.S. in financial engineering programs by TFE Times (2020) and ranked 25th by QuantNet (2020) for our Master of Mathematical Finance joint program with Illinois Tech’s Department of Applied Mathematics.

Ranked in the Global Top 100 for our Master of Business Administration program by the Aspen Institute.

Ranked 21st in the best master’s of marketing programs by TFE Times (2019). Only business school in Chicago with a marketing analytics program that emphasizes data-driven methodologies.

Only business school in Chicago with a part-time Ph.D. program.

References

External links
 IIT Stuart, official site
 IIT, official site
Harold L. Stuart Travel Scrapbooks at the Newberry 
https://www.iit.edu/stuart/about/rankings-and-key-facts

1881 births
1966 deaths
American financiers